Mohammad Reza Delpak( (born in Tehran) is a sound Department Cinema of Iran.
He is the first sound designer of Iranian cinema.

Biography
Mohammad Reza Delpak was born in Tehran in 1955. He holds a master's degree and an honorary doctorate both in arts. He started his career as a sound designer and sound re-recording mixer in 1974. He initiated the term “Sound Designing” in Iran film industry in 1994 for the first time in “the fateful day” fiction feature film.
He has collaborated on over 100 feature fiction films and 45 documentary as a supervisor of sound design and mix. Most of these films have been selected by many international film festivals and received prestigious awards. This includes Cannes film festival, BAFTA, BFI, Berlin international film festival, Venice international film festival, Golden Globe, and Locarno international film festival. 
He honored by working with world-known Iranian filmmakers, including Abbas Kiarostami, Asghar Farhadi, Majid Majidi, Jafar Panahi, Dariush Mehrjui, and Reza Dormishian. 
Two of the films he has contributed as supervisor of Sound Designer & mix, the Sales Man, 2016 and A Separation, 2011 both directed by Asghar Farhadi, have been awarded in Oscar Academy as the best foreign language films. The Children of Heaven by Majid Majidi also was nominated in Oscar Academy 1998. 
He is privileged by receiving several precious national awards namely, the Crystal Simorgh, the Statue of the Cinema House, and a Memorial Statue.
Since 2016, he has been a member and jury of the American Academy of Motion Picture Arts and Sciences.

Filmography
A Hero 2021
Sun Children 2020
Sun (supervising sound editor) 2019
Hava, Maryam, Ayesha (supervising sound editor) 2019
A man without shadow 2019
 Living 2018
 About The Salesman 2018
 Beyond the Clouds (2017 film) (supervising sound editor) 2017
 Under the Smoky Roof (2017)
 The End Of Dreams (2017)
 Lögndagen (supervising sound editor) 2017
 The Salesman (2016 film) Sound department (Sound Designer) and Mixing 2016
 Lantouri (supervising sound editor)  2016 
 Muhammad: The Messenger of God (film)  (supervising sound editor)  2015
 Berlin -7º (sound editor) 
Hush! Girls Don't Scream  (supervising sound editor) 2013 
 I'm Not Angry! (2012)
 Orange Suit    (sound mixer) 2012
Hatred (2012 film)
 Like Someone in Love (film) (Sound Designer)   2012
 The Bear (2012 film)  (sound editor)    2012 
 Wind and Fog (supervising sound editor) 2011
 A Separation  sound designer and sound mixer 2011
 Life with Closed Eyes (supervising sound editor)  (2010)
 40 Years Old (supervising sound editor) (2010)
 Whisper with the Wind  (sound mixing)   2009
 About Elly (sound mixing) and (Sound Designer) 2009
 Shirin (film) (supervising sound editor) 2008
 Khak Ashena (supervising sound editor) 2008
 The Song of Sparrows (supervising sound editor) 2008
 Offside (2006 Iranian film)  (sound designer)   2006
 Mainline (Khun bazi), 2006
 Pars Sea  (supervising sound editor)  (2006)
 Zaman mi-istad  (sound designer) 2006
 One Night (2005 film)   (supervising sound editor)  2005
 Khab-e talkh   (sound designer)  2005
 The Willow Tree  (sound designer and mixer)  2005
 Tradition of Lover Killing (sound designer)  2004
 Bitter Dream   (sound designer and mixer)   2004
 Gilaneh  (sound designer and mixer) 2004 
 Navel  (sound mixer)  2004
 White Nights (sound mixer)  2003
 Letters in the Wind (film) (Production designer) 2002
 Along the wind in the desert alone (2002)
 Zagros (supervising sound editor)
 Baran  (Sound Department)  2001
ABC Africa (Sound Department)  2001
  Sanam (sound designer) 2000
 Birth of a Butterfly (sound designer) 2000
 The Wind Will Carry Us  (sound designer) / (sound mixer) 1999 
 The Triumphant Warrior (sound mixer) 1999
 A Mother's Love (sound designer) 1999
 The Color of Paradise (sound designer) 1999
 Children of Heaven (supervising sound editor) 1998
 Taste of Cherry (sound designer)   1997
 The Mirror (1997 film)  (sound mixing)  1997
 The Father (1996 film) (supervising sound editor) 1996
  Bolandiha-ye sefr (sound) 1993
  Se mard-e aami (sound) 1993 
  The Grey City (sound) 1991 
 Water, Wind, Dust 1989
  Ma istadeim (sound) 1984 
  Kilometr-e 5 (sound) 1982 
 Ballad of Tara  (sound) 1979
 Prophet Joseph (TV series) (sound designer)
  Qaleh 1966 (Documentary short) (sound mixer) 
  Teheran, payetakht-e Iran ast 1966 (Documentary short) (sound mixer)

Awards 
(10 Celorian Fajr 5 Statues of Hafiz and 5 Statues of the Cinema House and 1 Award of the Writers and Critics Association)
The 14th Cinema House Celebration-
Fourth Cinema House Celebration; Statue; Best Sounding and Mix; The Long Films Competition; 2000 Under the City
Crystal Simorgh Best Sound and Wax
Winner of the 32st Fajr Film Festival  Lantouri
Winner of the 31st Fajr Film Festival - Berlin 7
Winner of the 16th Fajr Film Festival - Birth of a Butterfly
Winner of the 20th Fajr Film Festival - Travel to Tomorrow
Winner of the 17th Fajr Film Festival - The Color of Paradise
Seventh Winner of Fajr Film Festival - Bear
Winner of the 27th Fajr International Film Festival - About Elly
Winner of the 24th Fajr Film Festival - Time is up
Winner of the 19th Fajr Film Festival - Rain
I'm not angry at the thirty-second winner of the Fajr Film Festival
Hafiz Statue; Best Sound; Mohammad Reza Delapak; The 10th Celebration of the World of Pictures; The Cinematic Part of the Game (2007)

References 

Persian Wikipedia
mohammad-reza-delpak

The Swedish Film Database
Reza Delpak to conduct sound designing workshop

Oscars invites Hayedeh Safiyari and Mohammad Delpak to join the academy (June 2017)
The Jury Members of the 10th Iran Documentary Independent Award Announced

External links

 
 

1964 births
Living people